Arnold Alexander Stulce (April 29, 1925 – May 7, 2020) was an American politician and businessman.

Stulce was born in Soddy-Daisy, Tennessee and graduated from the Soddy-Daisy High School. He served as a pilot in the United States Army Air Corps during World War II. He graduated from North Carolina State University in 1949. He worked as a personnel manager for DuPont. Stulce served on the Hamilton County, Tennessee School Board and served as the chair. He also served on the Soddy-Daisy City Commission and was the vice-chair. Stulce served in the Tennessee House of Representatives, from 1993 to 1996, and was a Democrat.

Notes

1925 births
2020 deaths
People from Soddy-Daisy, Tennessee
Military personnel from Tennessee
DuPont people
North Carolina State University alumni
Tennessee city council members
School board members in Tennessee
Democratic Party members of the Tennessee House of Representatives